Kanakala is an Indian surname. Notable people with the surname include:

 Suma Kanakala, Indian television anchor
 Rajiv Kanakala, Telugu and Kannada film and television actor
 Devadas Kanakala, Indian actor
 Lakshmi Kanakala, Indian actress
 Srihari Kanakala, Indian actor

Surnames of Indian origin